The Karelian Isthmus is the title of the first full-length studio LP album of Finnish metal band Amorphis, released in 1992.

Although The Karelian Isthmus took its name from a historic Finnish battleground, Karelian Isthmus, its lyrics focus on Amorphis's well known epic themes from the history of Finnish warfare and religion, but drawing more from Celtic mythology rather than the later traditions of Amorphis's own native land. The epic side is sometimes broken up by the occult lyrical themes in tracks including "Pilgrimage", "Misery Path" and "Black Embrace". In recent years, songs from this album have been receiving more play during Amorphis' live performances, despite being of a different style than their later works.

This release was the last recorded release to have the original lineup of the band as later on the band would have either additional members or original members quitting.  Privilege of Evil was the last release with the original lineup, but it was recorded before this album. Both releases were combined in a 2003 reissue.

Track listing

Personnel

Amorphis 
 Tomi Koivusaari − vocals, rhythm guitar
 Esa Holopainen − lead guitar
 Olli-Pekka Laine − bass
 Jan Rechberger − drums, keyboards

Additional personnel 
Tomas Skogsberg – mixing and engineering
Dave Shirk – mastering
 Scott Hull – remastering (at Visceral Sound)
 Miran Kim – cover art
Jukka Kolehmainen – vocals on "Vulgar Necrolatry"
Timo Tolkki – recording, engineering and mixing on Privilege of Evil EP

References 

Amorphis albums
1992 debut albums
Relapse Records albums